
Gmina Ślemień is a rural gmina (administrative district) in Żywiec County, Silesian Voivodeship, in southern Poland. The gmina also contains the villages (sołectwos) of Kocoń and Las.

Neighbouring gminas
Gmina Ślemień is bordered by the gminas of Andrychów, Gilowice, Łękawica, Stryszawa and Świnna.

References

Slemien
Żywiec County